David Adams and Menno Oosting were the defending champions, but did not participate this year.

Martin Damm and Henrik Holm won the title, defeating Karel Nováček and Carl-Uwe Steeb 6–0, 3–6, 7–5 in the final.

Seeds

  Udo Riglewski /  Michael Stich (quarterfinals)
  Hendrik Jan Davids /  Javier Sánchez (first round)
  Martin Damm /  Henrik Holm (champions)
  Karel Nováček /  Carl-Uwe Steeb (final)

Draw

Draw

External links
Draw

1993 BMW Open